The Teleajen is a left tributary of the river Prahova in southern Romania. Its source is at  elevation in the Ciucaș Mountains, north of Roșu Peak and the locality of Cheia. Upstream from its confluence with the Gropșoarele in Cheia, it is also called Berea or Cheița. It flows through the Cheia hollow, by the towns of Vălenii de Munte and Boldești-Scăeni and the city of Ploiești. It discharges into the Prahova near Palanca.

Towns and villages

The following towns and villages are situated along the river Teleajen, from source to mouth: Cheia, Măneciu, Homorâciu, Vălenii de Munte, Gura Vitioarei, Plopeni, Bucov, Dumbrava.

Tributaries

The following rivers are tributaries to the river Teleajen (from source to mouth):

Left: Pârâul Roșu, Pârâul Cucului, Gropșoarele, Pridvara, Brădetul, Pârâul lui Iepure, Pleșu, Valea Monteorului, Telejenel, Drajna, Gura Vitioarei, Bucovel
Right: Tigăile, Izvorul lui Manole, Bratocea, Babeș, Ciobu, Valea Neagră, Giumelnicu, Mogoșu, Stâna, Bobu, Carpen, Valea Popii, Valea Brusturei, Valea Orății, Valea Movilișului, Boulețu, Valea Mare, Crasna, Stâlpul, Bughea, Vărbilău, Telega, Dâmbu, Ghighiu, Pârâul Rece, Șoava, Leaotul

References

Rivers of Romania
Rivers of Prahova County